Laurence Tomson (1539 – 29 March 1608) was an English politician, author, and translator. He acted as the personal secretary of Sir Francis Walsingham, the secretary of state to Elizabeth I of England.

Tomson revised both the text and the annotations of the New Testament of the Geneva Bible.  His revised edition appeared in 1576.  Tomson was a Calvinist, and his annotations reflect that system of theology.

Life
He was born in Northamptonshire, and was admitted a demy of Magdalen College, Oxford, in 1553. He graduated B.A. in 1559, was elected a fellow of his college, and commenced M.A. in 1564. He accompanied Sir Thomas Hoby on his embassy to France in 1566; and in 1569 he resigned his fellowship.

Between 1575 and 1587 Tomson represented Weymouth and Melcombe Regis in the House of Commons, and he was member for Downton in 1588–9. In 1582 he was in attendance at court at Windsor Castle. According to his epitaph he travelled in Sweden, Russia, Denmark, Germany, Italy, and France; was conversant with twelve languages; and at one period gave public lectures on the Hebrew language at Geneva. He was employed in political affairs by Sir Francis Walsingham, after whose death he retired into private life.

Tomson died on 29 March 1608, and was buried in the chancel of the church at Chertsey, Surrey, where a black marble was erected to his memory with a curious Latin inscription.

Works
His works are:

 ‘.
 ‘Statement of Advantages to be obtained by the establishment of a Mart Town in England,’ 1572, manuscript in the Public Record Office. 
 ‘The New Testament …  Several other editions of Tomson's revision of the Genevan version of the New Testament were published in the whole Bible. It was based on the work of Pierre Loiseleur.
 ‘. Written in French. ...  (set forth by P. de Farnace). ... Translated into English,’ London, 1576, 1577, 1585, dedicated to Mrs. Ursula Walsingham. 
 ‘Sermons of J. Calvin on the Epistles of S. Paule to Timothie and Titus … Translated,’ London, 1579.
 ‘. The same briefly confuted by L. T. in a private letter’ (Harleian MS. 291, f. 183). 
 ‘Treatise on the matters in controversy between the Merchants of the Hanze Towns and the Merchants Adventurers,’ 1590, a Latin manuscript in the Public Record Office.
 ‘Mary, the Mother of Christ: her tears,’ London, 1596.
 ‘Brief Remarks on the State of the Low Countries’ (Cottonian MS., Galba D vii. f. 163).

References

Notes

External links

The Bible, that is, the Holy Scriptures conteined in the Olde and New Testament, translated according to the Ebrew and Greeke, and conferred with the best translations in diuers languages. With most profitable annotations vpon all the hard places, and other things of great importance (1595)
The Bible, that is, the Holy Scriptures conteined in the Olde and Newe Testament : translated according to the Ebrew and Greeke, and conferred with the best translations in diuers languages ; with most profitable annotations upon all the hard places, and other things of great importance .. (1599)

Attribution

1539 births
1608 deaths
English Calvinist and Reformed Christians
17th-century English writers
17th-century English male writers
Transcription (linguistics)
Fellows of Magdalen College, Oxford
English Calvinist and Reformed theologians
Linguists from England
16th-century Calvinist and Reformed theologians
17th-century Calvinist and Reformed theologians
English MPs 1572–1583
English MPs 1584–1585
English MPs 1586–1587
English MPs 1589
English expatriates in Switzerland
Academic staff of the University of Geneva